Forum for South Asia Studies (FSAS) is a collaborative academic effort by six faculties of Uppsala University of  Sweden aimed at facilitating and promoting research and education related to the South Asian countries: India, Pakistan, Sri Lanka, Nepal, Bangladesh, the Maldives and Afghanistan, on the national and international level.

Aims
The purpose of the Forum for South Asia Studies is to strengthen South Asia related research and education, and increase Uppsala University’s collaboration with the region. The Forum is a coordinated effort by the six faculties that constitute the Humanities and Social Sciences:

The Faculty of Theology
The Faculty of Law 
The Faculty of History and Philosophy
The Faculty of the Social Sciences 
The Faculty of Languages 
The Faculty of Educational Sciences

The FSAS aims at:
creating an academic environment for collaboration and information in research and education focusing on the South Asian countries: India, Pakistan, Sri Lanka, Nepal, Bangladesh, the Maldives and Afghanistan;
promoting and making visible South Asia related research and education at Uppsala University to other academic  environments and to the general public;
facilitating international collaboration between scholars in the field of South Asia research and education at Uppsala University and scholars from other universities.

Education
FSAS conducts a student and teacher exchange program between Uppsala University and Calcutta University.

Administration
The administration of the Forum for South Asia Studies is placed at the Department of History.

Margaret Hunt, Faculty of History and Philosophy, is the current director of the FSAS. Other board members are: Siddhartha Dhar, Dept. for Peace and Conflict Resolution; Jens Wilhelm Borgland, Faculty of Theology; Heinz Werner Wessler, Faculty of Languages; Kavita Dasgupta, Faculty of History and Philosophy.

References

External links
The Forum of South Asia Studies on Facebook.

Uppsala University
South Asia